Jerome Stanley Augustyniak (born September 2, 1958) is the drummer for the American alternative rock band 10,000 Maniacs. Augustyniak joined the band in March 1983, two years after the group formed. Augustyniak continues to perform with the band who tour extensively.  With 10,000 Maniacs, he is a member of the Buffalo Music Hall of Fame.

Discography
With 10,000 Maniacs
Secrets of the I Ching (1983)
The Wishing Chair (1985)
In My Tribe (1987)
Blind Man's Zoo (1989)
Hope Chest: The Fredonia Recordings 1982-1983 (1990)
Our Time in Eden (1992)
MTV Unplugged (1993)
Love Among the Ruins (1997)
The Earth Pressed Flat (1999)
Campfire Songs: The Popular, Obscure and Unknown Recordings (2004)
Live Twenty-Five (2006)
Extended Versions (2009)
Triangles (EP) (2011)
Music From The Motion Picture (2013)
Twice Told Tales (2015)
For Crying Out Loud (EP) (2016)
Playing Favorites (2016)
Live at the Belly Up (2017)

Other credits
Victory Gardens (1991) with John & Mary - drums
The Weedkiller's Daughter (1993) with John & Mary - drums
The Pinwheel Galaxy (2003) with John & Mary – drums, percussion
Peace Bridge (2007) with John & Mary – drums

References

External links
Official Site - 10,000 Maniacs

1958 births
Living people
10,000 Maniacs members
Musicians from Buffalo, New York
American rock drummers
20th-century American drummers
American male drummers
21st-century American drummers